The 2012–13 NBL season is the 31st season for the Adelaide 36ers in the NBL. In 2011–12, the 36ers missed out on the playoffs for the 5th time in the past 6 seasons, finishing the season with the club's second ever wooden spoon (the club's second in three years) with a worst ever 8-20 record. The 36ers, have won the NBL Championship four times (1986, 1998, 1998–99 and 2001–02), earning Adelaide the nickname of "Title Town", and with some astute off-season recruiting (helped by the demise of the Gold Coast Blaze), will be looking to get back to a position of power in the league.

The 36ers have played their home games at the 8,000 seat Adelaide Arena since 1992. The arena is the largest purpose built basketball venue in Australia and the fifth largest venue currently used in the NBL behind the Perth Arena (14,846 - set at 12,000 for NBL games), the Sydney Entertainment Centre (10,517), Hisense Arena in Melbourne (10,500) and the Vector Arena (9,300) in Auckland.

The season is the last of a 3-year contract for head coach Marty Clarke. As a player, Tasmanian born Clarke was a guard with the NBL championship winning North Melbourne Giants in 1989. Prior to joining the 36ers in 2010–11 he spent 12 years as first an assistant, and later head coach, at the Australian Institute of Sport (1998–2010). As well as being the 36ers Head Coach, Clarke is also an assistant coach of the Australian Boomers.

Off-season

Additions
(From the squad at the end of the 2011–12 NBL season)

* C. J. Massingale was released by the 36ers on 5 December 2012.* Scott Christopherson signed following the season ending Achilles tendon injury to Mitch Creek, though officially he is the replacement for Massingale.

Subtractions
(From the squad at the end of the 2011–12 NBL season)

Current roster

Depth chart

2012–13 NBL clubs
 
 
 
 
 
 
 
 

* State Sports Centre used by the Sydney Kings for one game only due to a clash of dates at their usual home, the Sydney Entertainment Centre.* The Melbourne Tigers and New Zealand Breakers use two home venues each during the season, with finals games (if they qualify) to be played at the larger Hisense and Vector Arena's respectively.* The Perth Wildcats are the only team with an entirely new venue in 2012-13, with the 14,846 seat Perth Arena replacing their previous home, the 4,500 seat Challenge Stadium.

Regular season

Ladder

Game log

Regular season
 Games with a * are televised on One HD. Games with ** are on Network Ten. Games with *** shown on Sky Sport NZ

|- style="background-color:#bbffbb;"
| 1**
| 7 October
| Tigers
| W 84-61
| Daniel Johnson, Stephen Weigh (21)
| Daniel Johnson, Luke Schenscher (9)
| Adam Gibson (7)
| Adelaide Arena3,988
| 1-0
|- style="background-color:#ffcccc;"
| 2***
| 12 October
| @ Breakers
| L 59-73 
| Daniel Johnson (15)
| Luke Schenscher (9)
| Nathan Crosswell (3)
| Vector Arena6,625
| 1-1
|- style="background-color:#bbffbb;"
| 3
| 20 October
| Taipans
| W 85-81
| Adam Gibson (21)
| Luke Schenscher (10)
| Jason Cadee (7)
| Adelaide Arena4,331
| 2-1
|- style="background-color:#ffcccc;"
| 4**
| 28 October
| Hawks
| L 63-77
| Anthony Petrie (16)
| Daniel Johnson (7)
| Adam Gibson (7)
| Adelaide Arena4,720
| 2-2

|- style="background-color:#bbffbb;"
| 5**
| 4 November
| @ Kings
| W 88-81
| Luke Schenscher (18)
| Anthony Petrie (11)
| Daniel Johnson (7)
| Sydney Entertainment Centre4,660
| 3-2
|- style="background-color:#ffcccc;"
| 6
| 9 November
| @ Tigers
| L 66-96 
| Anthony Petrie (15)
| Daniel Johnson (8)
| Adam Gibson,  Jason Cadee,  Nathan Crosswell (2)
| Hisense Arena5,283
| 3-3
|- style="background-color:#bbffbb;"
| 7**
| 11 November
| Wildcats
| W 77-65
| C. J. Massingale (18)
| Stephen Weigh (11)
| Nathan Crosswell (6)
| Adelaide Arena3,696
| 4-3
|- style="background-color:#bbffbb;"
| 8*
| 16 November
| @ Wildcats
| W 69-65
| Daniel Johnson (21)
| Daniel Johnson (15)
| Adam Gibson (6)
| Perth Arena11,562
| 5-3
|- style="background-color:#ffcccc;"
| 9
| 30 November
| @ Crocodiles
| L 73-75
| Adam Gibson (17)
| Stephen Weigh (9)
| Adam Gibson (7)
| Townsville Entertainment Centre3,255
| 5-4

|- style="background-color:#ffcccc;"
| 10**
| 2 December
| Kings
| L 85-88
| Daniel Johnson (24)
| Luke Schenscher (10)
| Adam Gibson (10)
| Adelaide Arena4,015
| 5-5
|- style="background-color:#ffcccc;"
| 11**
| 9 December
| Wildcats
| L 85-91 (OT)
| Daniel Johnson (23)
| Anthony Petrie, Mitch Creek (7)
| Adam Gibson (6)
| Adelaide Arena3,485
| 5-6
|- style="background-color:#ffcccc;"
| 12
| 15 December
| Crocodiles
| L 75-80 
| Luke Schenscher (18)
| Luke Schenscher (12)
| Adam Gibson (9)
| Adelaide Arena4,493
| 5-7
|- style="background-color:#ffcccc;"
| 13*
| 28 December
| Breakers
| L 66-71
| Luke Schenscher (25)
| Luke Schenscher (16)
| Stephen Weigh, Jason Cadee, Luke Schenscher, Nathan Crosswell (2)
| Adelaide Arena4,740
| 5-8
|- style="background-color:#ffcccc;"
| 14
| 31 December
| @ Crocodiles
| L 82-86
| Stephen Weigh (21)
| Stephen Weigh (10)
| Luke Schenscher (6)
| Townsville Entertainment Centre4,124
| 5-9

|- style="background-color:#ffcccc;"
| 15*
| 4 January
| Crocodiles
| L 61-75
| Adam Gibson (22)
| Daniel Johnson (9)
| Adam Gibson, Nathan Crosswell (3)
| Adelaide Arena3,997
| 5-10
|- style="background-color:#ffcccc;"
| 16
| 5 January
| @ Kings
| L 82-86
| Adam Gibson (19)
| Daniel Johnson (12)
| Adam Gibson, Jason Cadee (5)
| Sydney Entertainment Centre4,511
| 5-11
|- style="background-color:#bbffbb;"
| 17**
| 13 January
| Kings
| W 82-64
| Daniel Johnson (24)
| Daniel Johnson, Stephen Weigh, Anthony Petrie (7)
| Nathan Crosswell (4)
| Adelaide Arena4,489
| 6-11
|- style="background-color:#ffcccc;"
| 18**
| 20 January
| Breakers
| L 66-84
| Anthony Petrie (19)
| Daniel Johnson (9)
| Adam Gibson (4)
| Adelaide Arena4,630
| 6-12
|- style="background-color:#ffcccc;"
| 19**
| 27 January
| @ Tigers
| L 80-87
| Daniel Johnson (25)
| Daniel Johnson (10)
| Adam Gibson (6)
| State Netball and Hockey Centre3,215
| 6-13

|- style="background-color:#ffcccc;"
| 20*
| 1 February
| Hawks
| L 78-86
| Daniel Johnson (21)
| Daniel Johnson (7)
| Adam Gibson (9)
| Adelaide Arena3,628
| 6-14
|- style="background-color:#ffcccc;"
| 21*
| 8 February
| @ Wildcats
| L 67-73
| Daniel Johnson (22)
| Anthony Petrie (7)
| Adam Gibson (5)
| Perth Arena10,779
| 6-15
|- style="background-color:#ffcccc;"
| 22**
| 10 February
| Tigers
| L 71-84
| Daniel Johnson (20)
| Daniel Johnson (12)
| Adam Gibson (7)
| Adelaide Arena5,055
| 6-16
|- style="background-color:#bbffbb;"
| 23
| 16 February
| Taipans
| W 71-68
| Anthony Petrie (18)
| Daniel Johnson (11)
| Adam Gibson (4)
| Cairns Convention Centre3,911
| 7-16
|- style="background-color:#bbffbb;"
| 24*
| 22 February
| @ Hawks
| W 91-90 (OT)
| Anthony Petrie (26)
| Anthony Petrie (8)
| Adam Gibson (5)
| WIN Entertainment Centre3,024
| 8-16
|- style="background-color:#ffcccc;"
| 25
| 28 February
| @ Breakers
| L 79-104
| Anthony Petrie (16)
| Daniel Johnson, Steven Weigh, Jason Cadee, Scott Christopherson (4)
| Adam Gibson (6)
| Vector Arena8,500
| 8-17

|- style="background-color:#ffcccc;"
| 26
| 9 March
| Taipans
| L 69-70
| Daniel Johnson (21)
| Daniel Johnson (13)
| Adam Gibson (5)
| Adelaide Arena5,309
| 8-18
|- style="background-color:#ffcccc;"
| 27
| 15 March
| @ Taipans
| L 73-76
| Anthony Petrie (19)
| Daniel Johnson (8)
| Adam Gibson (5)
| Cairns Convention Centre4,013
| 8-19
|- style="background-color:#ffcccc;"
| 28
| 23 March
| @ Hawks
| L 64-74
| Stephen Weigh (22)
| Daniel Johnson (10)
| Adam Gibson, Jason Cadee, Nathan Crosswell (2)
| WIN Entertainment Centre4,512
| 8-20

Finals

Player statistics

Regular season

* C. J. Massingale was released on 5 December 2012.

Finals

Awards

Player of the Week
 Week 7: Daniel Johnson – 21 points, 15 rebounds, 1 assist and 1 steal vs Perth Wildcats @ Perth Arena
 Week 14: Daniel Johnson – 24 points, 7 rebounds, 2 blocks vs Sydney Kings @ Adelaide Arena

Player of the Month

Coach of the Month

NBL Award Winners
 NBL Best Sixth Man – Anthony Petrie (nominated)
 NBL Rookie of the Year – Tom Daly (nominated)
 All-NBL Second Team – Daniel Johnson
 NBL Leading Rebounder – Daniel Johnson, 8.1 per game

Season summary
After a strong start to the season where they were 5-3 after Round 7, including two wins over the Perth Wildcats, one at the opening of the 14,856 seat Perth Arena, Adelaide were sitting third on the NBL ladder and were looking good for a return to the playoffs. That was as good as it got for the 36ers though, following the 69-65 win over the Wildcats in Perth, Adelaide went on to a club record equaling eight-game losing streak from which they would never recover. The 36ers 5-3 start had come to a grinding halt and they went 3-17 over the final two-thirds of the season.

Import player C. J. Massingale was cut from the team on 5 December, while young gun Mitch Creek was lost for the season with an Achilles tendon suffered against the Crocodiles on 15 December. Former Iowa State guard Scott Christopherson was signed as Massingale's replacement, but had a season he would rather forget, only scoring in double figures once in 14 games, a 16 point effort against the Cairns Taipans on 15 March. Starting centre Luke Schenscher also missed seven games through injury after a heavy fall against the Sydney Kings on 13 January. Adelaide won the game against the Kings 84-62 at the Adelaide Arena, snapping their eight-game losing streak.

Bright spots for the 36ers were 6'11" power forward/centre Daniel Johnson who won two "NBL Player of the Week" awards (the only 36er to win one during the season) and was selected to the All-NBL Second Team, improving on his 2011–12 selection to the All-NBL Third Team. DJ completed eight double-double's during the season and easily led the team in scoring, averaging 16.2 points per game (next best in the team was co-captain Adam Gibson with 11.6 ppg). His points average was also the 5th best in the NBL and he also led the league in rebounding with 8.1 per game. Johnson was also selected as the starting centre for the South All-Stars in the NBL All-Star Game played in Adelaide on 22 December.

Hard working forward Anthony Petrie was nominated for NBL's Best Sixth Man award. Petrie generally started from the bench for the 36ers until Schenscher's injury thrust him into a starting role and he responded by averaging over 18 ppg as a starter. Petrie was an original bench selection for the NBL All-Star Game but withdrew with a back injury.

Local guard Tom Daly was elevated from being a Development Player to having a spot on the roster after Creek was injured and was rewarded for his good performances with nomination for the NBL's Rookie of the Year award.

The 36ers finished the season in 8th and last place on the NBL ladder, their second wooden spoon in a row and the club's third in four seasons. They became the first team since the Bankstown Bruins in 1979 and 1980 to earn consecutive wooden spoons in the NBL.

Before the last game of the season against the Wollongong Hawks at the WIN Entertainment Centre in Wollongong, co-captain Nathan Crosswell announced his retirement and that the game would be his 350th and last in the NBL. Crosswell started his career with the Melbourne Tigers in 1999 and won the 2007–08 NBL championship with the Tigers.

Despite finishing on the bottom of the NBL ladder at the end of the regular season and only having a 4-10 record at the Adelaide Arena, the Adelaide 36ers finished 4th in average attendances with 60,576 attending the 14 home games for an average of 4,327 per game. The highest attendance was 5,309 for the final home game of the season against the Cairns Taipans (Round 22), while the lowest home attendance was 3,485 for the Round 10 overtime game with the Perth Wildcats.

Adelaide 36ers Awards
 Most Valuable Player (Mark Davis Trophy): Daniel Johnson
 Players' Player: Adam Gibson and Tom Daly
 Most Improved Player: Tom Daly
 Best Defensive Player: Adam Gibson
 Best Club Person: Narelle Smith

See also
2012–13 NBL season

References

External links 
 Official website of the Adelaide 36ers

Adelaide 36ers seasons
Ade